The Fair License is a short, simple and permissive free software licence. Its text is composed of only one sentence and a disclaimer, thus being the shortest license ever approved by the Open Source Initiative. It is also possible to use the Fair License for images, books, music or more generally all kinds of media. The text of the license is as follows:

<Copyright Information>

Usage of the works is permitted provided that this instrument is retained with the works, so that any entity that uses the works is notified of this instrument.

DISCLAIMER: THE WORKS ARE WITHOUT WARRANTY.

More popular alternatives to the Fair License are the MIT License,
the Zero-clause BSD license
and the ISC license that are also composed of few sentences, but their disclaimers are longer.

History 

The author, James William Pye, submitted the license for approval in January 2004. During the approval process, James answered to some questions as quoted below and proposed a draft version: 

Three days later, the almost-final version was defined as such:

On year later James William Pye summarized his motivation as such:

In 2015 Brazilian programmer Talles Lasmar determined the Fair License to be dead (broken links, deleted Wikipedia article). He contacted the original author and OSI, and created a new web site for it at http://fairlicense.org, which is also no longer active.

Translations 

In 2007,  published a Japanese translation as such:

<著作権情報>

本成果物は、本契約書が成果物に保持され、これにより本成果物を使用する者すべてに本契約書が示されることを条件に、使用が許可されます。

免責条項： 本成果物の保証は一切ありません。 

In 2013 users on the French Language Stack Exchange proposed a French translation as such:

<Information des droits d'auteur>

Les œuvres peuvent être réutilisées à condition d'être accompagnées du texte de cette licence, afin que tout utilisateur en soit informé.

AVERTISSEMENT : LES ŒUVRES N'ONT AUCUNE GARANTIE.

See also 
 Comparison of free and open-source software licenses

References

External links 
 Fair license at the Open Source Initiative
 Fair license at the Software Package Data Exchange

Free and open-source software licenses
Permissive software licenses